The year 1963 in architecture involved some significant architectural events and new buildings.

Events
 Work begins on the Ostankino Tower, designed by Nikolai Nikitin.
 Pennsylvania Station (New York City) by McKim, Mead and White is demolished.
 Work begins on the University of East Anglia in Norwich, England, designed by Denys Lasdun.
 Team 4 architectural practice established by Richard Rogers, Norman Foster and their respective wives.
 The avant-garde architectural collective Archigram stages the Living Cities exhibition at the Institute of Contemporary Arts in London.

Buildings and structures

Buildings opened

 February – Springs Mills Building on Manhattan, New York, United States, designed by Harrison & Abramovitz.
 March 7 – MetLife Building on Manhattan, New York, United States, designed by Richard Roth.
 June 22 – Arrábida Bridge, Douro river, Portugal, designed by Edgar Cardoso.
 October 15 – Berliner Philharmonie concert hall, designed by Hans Scharoun.
 November – Phoenix Life Insurance Company Building in Hartford, Connecticut, designed by Max Abramovitz.

Buildings completed

 St John the Baptist's Church, Ermine, Lincoln, Lincoln, England, designed by Sam Scorer.
 Großer Sendesaal (concert hall) of Hanover Broadcast Station in West Germany, designed by Dieter Oesterlen.
 Bankside Power Station in London, designed by Giles Gilbert Scott. (Adaptive reuse as the Tate Modern art museum in 2000.)
 Vickers Tower on Millbank in London, designed by Ronald Ward and Partners.
 Alexander Fleming House, Blocks A-C, at Elephant and Castle in London, designed by Ernő Goldfinger.
 Darwin Building, Royal College of Art, South Kensington, London, designed by H. T. and Elizabeth Cadbury-Brown, Sir Hugh Casson and Robert Goodden.
 University of Leicester Engineering Building, England, designed by James Stirling and James Gowan.
 Alpha House, Coventry, England, built, a 17-storey residential tower block, the world's first multi-storey building erected by the "jack block" system devised by Felix Adler of Richard Costain (Construction) Ltd.
Beinecke Rare Book & Manuscript Library at Yale University, designed by Gordon Bunshaft of Skidmore, Owings & Merrill.
 Core buildings of Fitzwilliam College, Cambridge, designed by Denys Lasdun.
 Salk Institute, by Louis I. Kahn, at La Jolla, California.
 Exxon Building in Houston, Texas.
 Hotel Ivoire, Abidjan, Ivory Coast, designed by Moshe Mayer.
 Jamaraat Bridge, Mina, Saudi Arabia.
 Kobe Port Tower in Kobe, Japan.
 Bunshaft Residence (sometimes called the Travertine House) in East Hampton, New York: designed by architect Gordon Bunshaft for himself and his wife, and his only residential project.
 Sadovnichesky Bridge, Vodootvodny Canal, Moscow.

Awards
 American Academy of Arts and Letters Gold Medal – Ludwig Mies van der Rohe
 AIA Gold Medal – Alvar Aalto
 RAIA Gold Medal – Arthur Stephenson
 RIBA Royal Gold Medal – William Holford
 Grand Prix de Rome, architecture – Jean-Louis Girodet

Publications
 John Summerson – The Classical Language of Architecture (BBC).

Births
 October 16 – Filipe Oliveira Dias, Portuguese architect and writer
 October 17 – Alejandro Zaera Polo, Spanish architect and teacher
 June 24 – Benedetta Tagliabue, Italian architect based in Barcelona

Deaths
 February 11 – Elmar Lohk, Estonian architect (born 1901)
 February 21 – Philip Hepworth, English architect (born 1890)
 March 17 – Adalberto Libera, Italian modernist architect (born 1903)
 March 22 – Herbert James Rowse, English architect working in Liverpool (born 1887)
 April 5 – J. J. P. Oud, Dutch architect (born 1890)
 April 23 – Adrian Gilbert Scott, English church architect, grandson of Sir George Gilbert Scott (born 1901)

References

 
20th-century architecture